Lucerne University of Applied Sciences and Arts (HSLU) is one of seven regional, public-funded universities of applied sciences founded in 1997 in its current form. The University was called University of Applied Sciences of Central Switzerland (German: Fachhochschule Zentralschweiz) until 15 October 2007. Lucerne University of Applied Sciences and Arts is a Swiss public vocational university with campuses in Lucerne, Horw, Emmenbrücke and Rotkreuz. Prior to Rotkreuz, a small campus in Zug for finance was held.

Schools
 School of Engineering and Architecture (Hochschule Luzern – Technik & Architektur)
 Biotechnology Space Support Center (BIOTESC)
 School of Computer Science and Information Technology (Hochschule Luzern – Informatik)
 Business School and Management (Hochschule Luzern – Wirtschaft)
 School of Social Work (Hochschule Luzern – Soziale Arbeit)
 School of Art and Design (Hochschule Luzern – Design & Kunst)
 School of Music was formed in 1999 when the city's Conservatory of Music, Academy of Church Music, and Jazz School merged into a single university-status institution, called Hochschule Luzern – Musik.

Academic programs
The University offers English and German based education with levels from undergraduate to graduate. Bachelor, Master and certificate programs are available in fields like design, music, fine arts, animation 2D/3D, object design, banking & finance, international management & economics, sustainable energy systems, to list a few from the other variety courses they offer.

Beginning with Winter Semester 2018, the university announced that students can now study yodeling. This announcement drew press coverage due to its association with the German term Jodeldiplom, a term for a useless or vanity-driven degree. At the end of the course of study, the students will be awarded a Bachelor of Arts in music.

See also
List of largest universities by enrollment in Switzerland

Notes and references

External links
 
 Lucerne University of Applied Sciences and Arts Factsheet by the Conference of the Universities of Applied Sciences Switzerland (PDF)
 Information about Lucerne University of Applied Sciences and Arts
 Hochschule Luzern - Musik 
 Welcome page 

L
Educational institutions established in 1997
1997 establishments in Switzerland